Freilich may refer to:


People
 Alicia Freilich (born 1939), Venezuelan writer
 Edith Freilich (1911–2011), American bridge player
 Eitan Freilich (born 1993), British singer
 Hadassah Lieberman (born 1948, as Hadassah Freilich), American lobbyist and campaigner, wife of politician Joe Lieberman
 Janet Freilich (born 1987), namesake of the asteroid 20593 Freilich
 Michael Freilich (politician) (born 1980), Belgian journalist and politician
 Michael Freilich (oceanographer) (1954–2020), American director of NASA's Earth science program
 Yuval Freilich (born 1995), Israeli épée fencer

Other uses
 20593 Freilich, an asteroid
 Sentinel-6 Michael Freilich, an oceanographic satellite

See also

 
 Michael Freilich (disambiguation)